Al-Hakam ibn Amr al-Ghifari (d. 670/71), was a companion of Muhammad and the Umayyad governor of Khurasan and commander of Arab expeditions into Transoxiana (Central Asia) from 665 until his death in Merv.

Life
Al-Hakam ibn Amr was a son of Amr ibn Mujaddah ibn Hidhyam ibn al-Harith ibn Nu'ayla of the Banu Ghifar, a clan of the Kinana tribe. Al-Hakam was a companion of the Islamic prophet Muhammad and one of his banner bearers in battle. He settled in Basra, the Arab garrison town and springboard of the Muslim conquests of the Sasanian Empire established in 636. There was a sparse presence of Ghifar tribesmen in Basra. His brother Rafi was a transmitter of hadith from Muhammad.

According to al-Tabari and al-Baladhuri, in 665 Ziyad ibn Abihi, the practical viceroy of Iraq and the eastern Umayyad Caliphate, centralized the vast region of Khurasan (east of Iran and west of the Oxus) into a single provincial administration based in Merv under the governorship of al-Hakam. According to an anecdote cited by both historians, Ziyad had intended to appoint the veteran commander al-Hakam ibn Abi al-As al-Thaqafi to the post, but when his chamberlain mistakenly brought al-Hakam ibn Amr to his court he appointed him instead, remarking that al-Hakam was a companion of Muhammad and "an upright fellow" or "a man of nobility". Another traditional Muslim report holds that al-Hakam was appointed by Ziyad in 664. Al-Tabari notes that Ziyad also assigned six deputies under al-Hakam charged with the collection of the kharaj (land tax and/or possibly poll tax). 

Al-Hakam died and was buried in Merv. His appointed successor Anas ibn Abi Unas, who was promptly dismissed by Ziyad, led his funeral prayers. His grave was mentioned by the sources as late as the reign of the Abbasid caliph al-Ma'mun.

References

Bibliography

670 deaths
Generals of the Umayyad Caliphate
Companions of the Prophet
Umayyad governors of Khurasan
Kinana